Alamanda may refer to:

 Alamanda, Orissa, a village in Orissa State, India
 Alamanda, Vizianagaram district, a village in Andhra Pradesh, India
 Alamanda de Castelnau (born c. 1160), trobairitz
 Alamanda Motuga (born 1994), Samoan rugby union player

See also
 Alamada, Philippines
 Allamanda, a genus of flowering plants